Krista Purana (Devanagari: क्रिस्त पुराण, "The Christian Puranas") is an epic poem on the life of Jesus Christ written in a mix of Marathi and Konkani by Fr.Thomas Stephens, S.J. (1549–1619). Adopting the literary form of the Hindu puranas, it retells the entire story of mankind from the creation days to the time of Jesus, in lyrical verse form. The Christian Puranas – 11,000 stanzas of 4 verses – were very popular in the churches of the area where they were sung on special occasions up to the 1930s. Although no copy of the original edition has yet been discovered, it is believed to have been published at Rachol (Raitur) in 1616 (while the author was still living), 1649, and 1654.

Editions 
 Discurso sobre a vinda do Jesu-Christo Nosso Salvador ao mundo, dividido em dous Tratados, pelo Padre Thomaz Estevão, Inglez, da Companhia de Jesu. Impresso em Rachol com licencia da Santa Inquisicão, e Ordinario no Collegio de Todos os Santos da Companhia de Jesu Anno 1616.  First edition, Rachol [Raitur], Goa, 1616. [Roman script.] The title with all its details is taken from the ‘Licence,’ which itself is found not in the MS collated by J.L. Saldanha, but in J.H. da Cunha Rivara’s Introduction to his edition of Stephens, Grammatica da Lingua Concani, 1857, Imprimatur 22 June 1615. "From the Censures and Licences annexed it seems to have originally been written in Portuguese and then translated into the vernacular in which we now find it. The translation appears to have been completed in 1614, and printed for the first time, in 1616, as declared in the descriptive title in Portuguese first given to the book." No copy has been traced to date.
 Puranna. Second edition, 1649. [Roman script.] "A second edition, taken in hand in 1646 under the auspices of the aforementioned Fr[ei] Gaspar de S. Miguel, who, with some other ecclesiastics, completed a revision of the work on 20 February 1649, appears to have been published in the latter year under the title of the Puránna, in place of the original Portuguese designation borne by the first edition…. It is not known where the second edition was printed." The Drago edition, however, indicates (see front matter) that it was printed at Raitur, Goa, 1649. No copy has been traced to date. 
 Puránna. Em Goa com licenca da Santa Inquisicao e Ordinario no Collegio de S. Paolo novo de Companhia de Jesu. Anno de 1654. Third edition, Old Goa [according to Drago], 1654. [Roman script.] Licences by Rev. Fr Lucas da Cruz and another, dt. 2 January 1653 and 22 June 1654. No copy has been traced to date. See, however, the MS preserved in the Central Library, Panjim, listed below, which claims to be a copy of this third, 1654, edition. (The photo alongside is of this MS.) 
 The Christian Puránna of Father Thomas Stephens of the Society of Jesus: A Work of the 17th Century: Reproduced from manuscript copies and edited with a biographical note, an introduction, an English synopsis of contents and vocabulary. [Roman script.] 4th edition, by Joseph L. Saldanha. Bolar, Mangalore: Simon Alvares, 1907. Pp. xci+597. [Copies available at XB; St Pius X Seminary, Goregaon, Mumbai.] 
 Phādara Stīphanskṛta Khristapurāṇa: Paile va Dusare. 5th edition, by Shantaram P. Bandelu. First [printed edition in] Devanagari script. Poona: Prasad Prakashan, 1956. Pp. iv+(15)+(96)+1076. [Copies available at De Nobili College, Pune; United Theological College, Bangalore.] 
 Kristapurāṇa. 6th edition, by Caridade Drago, SJ. Second [printed edition in] Devanagari script. Pp. li+907. Mumbai: Popular Prakashan, 1996. [Copies available at Thomas Stephens Konknni Kendr, Alto Porvorim, Goa; Divyadaan: Salesian Institute of Philosophy, Nashik.]
 Phādara Thomas Stīphanskṛta Khristapurāṇa: Purāṇa 1 va 2: Sudhārita ani vistārita sampurṇa avṛtti hastalikhita Mārsden Marāṭhi padya pratitīla śloka, Marāṭhi bhāṣāntara; vistṛta sandarbha, parisiste va granthasuchi. Ed. and tr. Nelson Falcao, SDB. Bangalore: Kristu Jyoti Publications, 2009.
 "Christa Purana" (Konkani Translation). Edited and Translated by Suresh G. Amonkar. Goa: Directorate of Art and Culture, 2017.

Manuscripts

In Goa 
At least five MS of the Khristapurana have been located to date in Goa:
 The Goa Central Library MS: Discurso sobre a vinda de Jesu Christo Nosso Salvador ao Mundo dividido em dous tratados feito pelo Padre Thomas Estevão Ingrez da Companhia de Jesus. Impresso em Goa com licenca das Inquisicão, e Ordinario no Collegio de S. Paulo novo de Companhia de Jesu. Anno de 1654, Escripto por Manoel Salvador Rebello, Natural de Margão no Anno 1767. (CL)
 The Pilar MS, at the Museum of the Pilar Monastery, Pilar, Goa. (P)
 The M.C. Saldanha MS at the Thomas Stephens Konknni Kendr, Alto Porvorim, Goa (TSKK-1). Whether this M.C. Saldanha is the same as the well-known professor Mariano Saldanha of Ucassaim, Goa, is yet to be established. But from the fact that the MS has been bound in Kodailbail, Mangalore, it is highly probable that this is one of the 5 MS used by J.L. Saldanha in the preparation of his 1907 edition of the Khristapurana. 
 Another MS at the Thomas Stephens Konknni Kendr (TSKK-2).
 The Bhaugun Kamat Vagh MS in the Pissurlencar Collection at the Goa University Library (BKV).

Apart from CL, the MS are not dated. The chronology will therefore have to be established from internal evidence, taking into account the terminology (Romanized or Sanskritized), the number of cantos and strophes, the interpolations, the Praise of Marathi (missing in the Marsden MS), the chapter on the Miracle at Cana (missing in the Marsden MS), etc. This will also help us move closer to establishing whether or not the Sanskritized M was the ‘original’ text of the Khristapurana.

In the United Kingdom 
 The Adi or First Puran + The Deva Puran. [Devanagari manuscripts.] Marsden Collection Manuscripts. London: School of Oriental and African Studies. N.d.

The manuscripts had belonged to the library of William Marsden who, Abbot says, ‘a century ago’ had made a large collection of coins and Oriental books when in India, many of the latter having been obtained from the Archives in Goa (which Archives, Abbot does not say). The library was given by Marsden to the Kings College, London, in 1853, but in 1916 came into the possession of the School of Oriental Studies. The catalogue contained only a few Marathi items. Abbot reports two, with entries made by Mr Marsden as follows: "The Adi or First Puran, a Christian work in the Mahratta language and Nagari character appearing to contain an exposition of the Old Testament." "The Deva Puran, or Divine History, a Christian work in the Mahratta language and Nagari character appearing to contain an exposition of the New Testament or History of Christ." The manuscript is in two volumes differing in handwriting. The Deva Puran is a copy of an older copy. The MS end in the usual form of an Indian Puran, Iti Mahapurane, or Iti Deva-Purane, which the Mangalore text does not do.

Abbott claims that this is a copy of Thomas Stephens’ original text. Bandelu feels that there is not enough evidence for Abbott’s claim. Falcao follows Abbott without really arguing his case. Strangely, while admitting that the Marsden MS is a MS and not an ‘edition,’ he still lists it as the 7th edition, coming after Drago, without giving any supporting reasons.

Fr H. Staffner obtained a microfilm of M and made 2 copies. One is in the Jaykar Library of the Pune University. The other is in Snehasadan, Pune. It would seem, however, that there is another microfilm of the same in the Mumbai Marathi Sansodhan Mandala, Mumbai, though D does not specify that this is M. Falcao (2003) follows Drago, but specifies that this microfilm is indeed of the Marsden MS.

In Mangalore 
 Manuscript, Kannada script. Carmelite Monastery, Kulshekara, Mangalore. See Fr Santhamayor. 
 St Aloysius College, Mangalore.

Doctoral theses 
 Quadra, Benedetta. "Il P. Tommaso Stephens, S.I. e il suo Purana Cristiano". Rome: Università degli Studi di Roma, 1943. [Falcao 2003 215. Untraceable.] 
 Malshe, S.G. "Stīphansacyā Kristapurāṇācā Bhāśika āṇi Vāṅmayīna Abhyāsa". Doctoral dissertation. Unpublished. Mumbai: University of Bombay, 1961. [Falcao 2003 215.]
 Falcao, Nelson. "Kristapurana: A Christian-Hindu Encounter: A Study of Inculturation in the Kristapurana of Thomas Stephens, SJ (1549-1619)". Published under the same title at Pune: Snehasadan / Anand: Gujarat Sahitya Prakash, 2003
 Royson, Annie Rachel. "Texts and Traditions in Seventeenth Century Goa: Reading Cultural Translation, Sacredness, and Transformation in the Kristapurāṇa of Thomas Stephens S.J.". Doctoral Thesis. Gandhinagar: Indian Institute of Technology Gandhinagar, 2018.

See also
Puranas
Translations of the Bible in Indian languages
List of topics on the Portuguese Empire in the East

Bibliography 
Falcao, Nelson. Kristapurāṇa, a Christian-Hindu encounter: a study of inculturation in the Kristapurāṇa of Thomas Stephens, S.J. (1549-1619). Anand: Gujarat Sahitya Prakash, 2003. .
Coelho, Ivo. "Thomas Stephens’ Khristapurāṇa: A New Edition and Translation by Nelson Falcao, SDB." Divyadaan: Journal of Philosophy and Education 20/3 (2009) 473-482.
Coelho, Ivo. "Review Article: A Significant Publication." [Review of Phādara Thomasa Stīphanskṛta Khristapurāṇa, ed. and tr. Nelson Falcao (Bangalore: Kristu Jyoti Publications, 2009.] Vidyajyoti Journal of Theological Reflection 74/4 (April 2010) 307-314.
See also Indian Christian Writings: A Bibliography

References 
 

Indian chronicles
Jesuit publications
1616 books
1616 poems
Marathi-language literature
Konkani
Epic poems